Potamogeton clystocarpus is a rare species of flowering plant in the pondweed family known by the common name Little Aguja pondweed. It is endemic to Texas in the United States, where it is known only from one river canyon in Jeff Davis County. There is a single population of the aquatic plant in Little Aguja Creek, and it has never been seen anywhere else. This is a federally listed endangered species of the United States.

This aquatic plant has a stem growing up to 57 centimeters long, varying in length depending on the depth of the water. The delicate, spirally arranged leaves are linear in shape and up to 7.8 centimeters in length by 1 or 2 millimeters wide. The inflorescence is the only part of the plant that is not submersed. It arises a few centimeters above the water's surface. The plant reproduces sexually via seed and vegetatively via broken-off fragments of the stem, which can produce roots and anchor to form a new plant. Little else is known about the plant's life history.

The plant has been noted and collected several times since its first collection in 1931. Though extremely restricted in distribution, it has usually appeared common to abundant in the one stream where it occurs. The Little Aguja Creek drains the Davis Mountains of West Texas. It is a very dynamic river, experiencing low levels during drought, severe, scouring flooding during high-drainage seasons, and changing water quality from chemical contamination and livestock upriver.

In 1991 and 1992 heavy flooding scoured the canyon and the plant has not been seen since. Surveys have not relocated the plant.

References

clystocarpus
Flora of Texas
Jeff Davis County, Texas